The Unlicensed National Information Infrastructure (U-NII) radio band, as defined by the United States Federal Communications Commission, is part of the radio frequency spectrum used by WLAN devices and by many wireless ISPs.

As of March 2021, U-NII consists of eight ranges. U-NII 1 through 4 are for 5 GHz WLAN (802.11a and newer), and 5 through 8 are for 6 GHz WLAN (802.11ax) use. U-NII 2 is further divided into three subsections.

Wireless ISPs generally use 5.725–5.825 GHz.
In the USA licensed amateur radio operators are authorized 5.650–5.925 GHz by Part 97.303 of the FCC rules.

U-NII power limits are defined by the United States CFR Title 47 (Telecommunication), Part 15 - Radio Frequency Devices, Subpart E - Unlicensed National Information Infrastructure Devices, Paragraph 15.407 - General technical requirements.

Many other countries use similar bands for Wireless communication due to a shared IEEE standard. However, regulatory use in individual countries may differ.

The defunct European HiperLAN standard operates in same frequency band as the U-NII.

5 GHz (802.11a/h/j/n) 

Except where noted, all information taken from Annex J of IEEE 802.11-2007 modified by amendments k, y and n. Because countries set their own regulations regarding specific uses and maximum power levels within these frequency ranges, it is recommended that local authorities are consulted as regulations may change at any time.

It operates over four ranges:

U-NII Low (U-NII-1): 5.150–5.250 GHz. Originally limited to indoor use only.  Regulations required use of an integrated antenna, with power limited to 50 mW.  Rules changed in 2014 to permit outdoor operation, maximum fixed power 1 watt, maximum fixed EIRP 4 watts (+36 dBm) point-to-multipoint, 200 watts (+53 dBm) point-to-point.   However, strict out-of-band emission rules limit practical point-to-point power to lower levels.
U-NII Mid (U-NII-2A): 5.250–5.350 GHz. Both outdoor and indoor use, subject to Dynamic Frequency Selection (DFS, or radar avoidance).  Regulations allow for a user-installable antenna. Power limited to 250 mW.
U-NII-2B: 5.350–5.470 GHz. Currently 120 MHz of spectrum not allocated by the FCC for unlicensed use.
U-NII Worldwide (U-NII-2C / U-NII-2e): 5.470–5.725 GHz. Both outdoor and indoor use, subject to Dynamic Frequency Selection (DFS, or radar avoidance). Power limited to 250 mW. This spectrum was added by the FCC in 2003 to "align the frequency bands used by U-NII devices in the United States with bands in other parts of the world". The FCC currently has an interim limitation on operations on channels which overlap the 5600–5650 MHz band.
U-NII Upper (U-NII-3): 5.725–5.850 GHz. Sometimes referred to as U-NII / ISM due to overlap with the ISM band. Regulations allow for a user-installable antenna. Power limited to 1W
DSRC/ITS (U-NII-4): 5.850–5.925 GHz. At present U-NII-4 spectrum is being considered by the FCC for unlicensed use. U-NII-4 is presently only usable for Dedicated Short Range Communications Service (DSRC) and licensed amateur radio operators.

In 2007, the FCC began requiring that devices operating in channels 52, 56, 60 and 64 must have Dynamic Frequency Selection (DFS) capabilities. This is to avoid communicating in the same frequency range as some radar. In 2014, the FCC issued new rules for all devices due to interference with government weather radar systems. Fines and equipment seizure were listed as punishment for non-compliance.

See also
List of WLAN channels § 5 GHz (802.11a/h/j/n/ac/ax)
Part 15 (FCC rules)
ISM band
802.11

References

External links
 In the USA, CFR Title 47 Part 15 (revised in 2005) describes the regulation of the U-NII bands.
 The FCC's U-NII regulations for 5 GHz wireless operation in the USA.
 RadioElectronics' article on Wi-Fi / WLAN Channels, Frequencies, Bands & Bandwidths
 Air802's article with tables of data on FCC Rules and Regulations which specifies frequencies and channels.
 Government of India NATIONAL FREQUENCY ALLOCATION PLAN-2011 
 Government of India NATIONAL FREQUENCY ALLOCATE TABLE (Latest) 

Bandplans
Microwave bands